Made in Sweden is a 1969 Swedish drama film directed by Johan Bergenstråhle. It was entered into the 19th Berlin International Film Festival, where it won a Silver Bear award.

Cast
 Lena Granhagen - Kristina
 Per Myrberg - Jörgen Stenberg
 Max von Sydow - Magnus Rud
 Karl-Birger Blomdahl - Olof Myhre
 Börje Ahlstedt - Jesper Rud
 Ingvar Kjellson - Niklas Hedström
 Fred Hjelm - Jonas Myhre
 Lars Amble - Martin
 Toivo Pawlo - Man at Solvalla
 Olof Bergström - Grönroos
 Gunnar Arvidson - Editor at newspaper
 Achit Unhanandana - Monk in Bangkok

References

External links

1969 films
1960s Swedish-language films
1969 drama films
Films directed by Johan Bergenstråhle
Swedish drama films
1960s Swedish films